Westliche Börde is a Verbandsgemeinde ("collective municipality") in the Börde district in Saxony-Anhalt, Germany. Before 1 January 2010, it was a Verwaltungsgemeinschaft. It is situated approximately 35 km southwest of Magdeburg, in the western part of the Magdeburger Börde. The seat of the Verbandsgemeinde is in Gröningen.

The Verbandsgemeinde Westliche Börde consists of the following municipalities:
 Am Großen Bruch 
 Ausleben 
 Gröningen 
 Kroppenstedt

References

Verbandsgemeinden in Saxony-Anhalt